David Jones  (born 11 February 1952) is a Welsh former professional footballer who played as a defender. He was part of the Wales national team between 1976 and 1980, playing eight matches and scoring one goal. He played his first match on 6 May 1976 against Scotland and his last match on 17 May 1980 against England.

See also
 List of Wales international footballers (alphabetical)

References

Living people
1952 births
Welsh footballers
Association football defenders
Wales international footballers
Place of birth missing (living people)
Date of death missing
Norwich City F.C. players
Nottingham Forest F.C. players
AFC Bournemouth players